Joseph Scott Finley (born June 29, 1987) is an American former professional ice hockey defenseman. He played twenty-one games in the National Hockey League (NHL) with the Buffalo Sabres and New York Islanders between 2011 and 2013. The rest of his career, which lasted from 2009 to 2018, was spent in the minor leagues and ended with three seasons with HIFK in the Finnish Liiga. Finley was selected by the Washington Capitals 27th overall in the 2005 NHL Entry Draft.

Playing career
Finley played for the Edina Peewee A state championship team in 1999–2000. Finley was a standout playing Minnesota High School hockey for the Edina Hornets. Due to Finley's strong play and leadership his freshman year, he made the White line the following year. In 2005, he said that making the White Line may well have been the greatest accomplishment of his hockey career.
Finley missed the majority of the 2009–10 season on injured reserve when on November 21, 2009, in a game with the Stingrays against the Gwinnett Gladiators, he ruptured an artery in his hand which required surgery.

On September 18, 2011, Finley accepted an invitation to training camp by the Buffalo Sabres. He impressed enough that he was signed to an AHL contract, and assigned to the Rochester Americans. Through the first quarter of the season, Finley was impressive as one half of the Americans shut-down defensive pairing. He led the Amerks in +/- with a +10. The Sabres and Finley reached a three-year contract on November 28, 2011, that will allow Finley to be called up by Sabres organization.

Two days after the deal was completed, Finley was called up by the Sabres where he made his NHL debut against the Red Wings on December 2, 2011. Finley was the 475th player to play in the NHL after starting his career in the ECHL.

Prior to the lockout shortened 2012–13 NHL season, Finley was claimed off waivers from the Sabres by the New York Islanders on January 14, 2013.

On July 29, 2014, Finley signed as a free agent to a one-year AHL contract with the Hamilton Bulldogs. In the 2014–15 season, Finley appeared in 54 games with the Bulldogs, contributing with 3 assists and 132 penalty minutes.

On October 8, 2015, Finley continued in the AHL, signing a one-year AHL deal with the Iowa Wild, an affiliate to the Minnesota Wild. In the 2015–16 season, Finley appeared in 56 games with Iowa, recording a professional high of 5 goals from the blueline.

On June 21, 2016, Finley opted to pursue a career abroad, agreeing to a one-year deal with Finnish club, HIFK, of the Liiga. Before Finley had arrived to Helsinki in 2016 he already got a nickname, "The Red #3" after Lalli Partinen, a former defenseman who played for HIFK in 1969–1977.

On February 3, 2017, HIFK announced a two-year contract extension with Finley.

Career statistics

References

External links
 

1987 births
Living people
American men's ice hockey defensemen
Bridgeport Sound Tigers players
Buffalo Sabres players
Edina High School alumni
Hamilton Bulldogs (AHL) players
Hershey Bears players
Ice hockey players from Minnesota
Iowa Wild players
National Hockey League first-round draft picks
New York Islanders players
North Dakota Fighting Hawks men's ice hockey players
Rochester Americans players
Sioux Falls Stampede players
South Carolina Stingrays players
Sportspeople from Edina, Minnesota
Washington Capitals draft picks